Luiza Chwialkowska Savage (styled Luiza Ch. Savage)   is the executive editor for growth at Politico and a contributor to Canadian political news programs on CTV, CPAC and CBC News Network. She is married to The New York Times' Washington correspondent Charlie Savage.

A former Washington bureau chief for Maclean's, Savage is also the writer/producer of documentaries on the Keystone XL pipeline and the effort to build a new bridge linking Detroit, Michigan and Windsor, Ontario.

Born in Poland, Savage grew up in Canada. She graduated from Harvard College with a bachelor's degree in economics and earned a master's degree from Yale Law School while on a Knight Foundation journalism fellowship.

References

External links

Canadian magazine journalists
Living people
Maclean's writers and editors
Harvard College alumni
Canadian people of Polish descent
Yale Law School alumni
Year of birth missing (living people)